Stephen Taylor may refer to:

 Stephen James Taylor (born 1967), American film and TV composer
 Stephen Taylor, Baron Taylor of Harlow (1910–1988), British physician, civil servant, politician and educator
 Stephen Taylor (academic), lecturer in human resources at Manchester Metropolitan University Business School
 Stephen Taylor (economist) (born 1954), professor of finance at Lancaster University Management School
 Stephen Taylor (priest) (born 1955), senior priest in the Church of England
 Stephen Wallace Taylor (born 1965), historian

See also
Steven Taylor (disambiguation)